Deutsche Werke was a German shipbuilding company that was founded in 1925 when Kaiserliche Werft Kiel and other shipyards were merged. It came as a result of the Treaty of Versailles after World War I that forced the German defense industry to shrink. The company was owned by the government of the Weimar Republic and its headquarters was in Berlin while the manufacturing location was in Kiel.

Deutsche Werke started building merchant ships, but when the Nazi Party gained power in 1933 the production was changed to naval ships. Besides shipbuilding, Deutsche Werke also produced firearms. Especially well-known are the so-called Ortgies pistols, which were particularly popular in the United States. The pistols were developed by Heinrich Ortgies.

During World War II the company expanded to Gdynia, establishing Deutsche Werke Gotenhafen.

Deutsche Werke facilities and infrastructure were destroyed during World War II by bombing raids. Parts of the works were reorganised as Maschinenbau Kiel.

In 1955 the shipyard areas were bought by Howaldtswerke.

Ships built at Deutsche Werke Kiel (selection)
 Panzerschiff  (later renamed Lützow)
 Heavy cruiser 
 Battleship 
 Aircraft carrier  (not completed)
 Destroyer Z1 - Z4 (Type Zerstörer 1934)
 U-boats Types IIA, B, C, D, VIIC, and XIV

References

External links

 u-boot-archiv.de webpage about the Deutsche Werke shipyard
 ortgies.net webpage about Ortgies pistol
 gunsworld.com webpage about the Ortgies pistol
 

Shipbuilding companies of Germany
Manufacturing companies established in 1925
Defunct manufacturing companies of Germany
Firearm manufacturers of Germany
Manufacturing companies based in Berlin
Companies of Prussia
Defunct firearms manufacturers
Kiel
1925 establishments in Germany
Defence companies of Germany
Manufacturing companies disestablished in 1945
1945 disestablishments in Germany